The Evangelical Reformed Presbyterian Church (ERPC) was a denomination Presbyterian, formed in 2006, by churches that separate of Presbyterian Church in America and Orthodox Presbyterian Church, on the charge that both denominations would be tolerant of the Federal Vision of Covenant Theology.

In 2015 the denomination dissolved and its churches became independent.

History 

The Presbyterian churches originate from the Protestant Reformation of the 16th century. It is the Christian churches Protestant that adhere to Reformed theology and whose form of ecclesiastical organization is characterized by the government of an assembly of elders. Government Presbyterian is common in Protestant churches that were modeled after the Reformation Protestant Switzerland, notably in Switzerland, Scotland, Netherlands,  France and portions of Prussia, of Ireland and, later, of United States.

In 2006, a group of churches split from Presbyterian Church in America and Orthodox Presbyterian Church, on the charge that both denominations would be tolerant of the Federal Vision of Covenant Theology. Together these churches constituted the Evangelical Reformed Presbyterian Church.

The denomination reached 6 churches in 2015. However, in October of the same year the IPRE was dissolved and its churches became independent since so.

Doctrine 

The denomination subscribed to the Westminster Confession of Faith, Westminster Larger Catechism and Westminster Shorter Catechism.

References 

Former Presbyterian denominations
Christian organizations established in 2006
Christian organizations disestablished in 2015
Presbyterian denominations established in the 21st century